Staphylaea staphylaea (common name: the stippled cowry) is a species of sea snail, a cowry, a marine gastropod mollusk in the family Cypraeidae, the cowries.

There is one subspecies : Staphylaea staphylaea laevigata Dautz., 1932.

Description

The shell of Staphylaea staphylaea reaches a size of 7 – 29 mm. It is oval, the dorsum surface is pale greyish with a thin longitudinal line in the middle, many small round protuberances and two brown areas at the extremities. The base is pale brown. The small teeth are extended to both sides of the entire base. In the living cowries the transparent mantle has an orange coloration, with long finger-like projections.

Distribution

This species is distributed in the Red Sea and in the Indian Ocean along Aldabra, Chagos, the Comores, the East Coast of South Africa, Kenya, Madagascar, the Mascarene Basin, Mauritius, Mozambique, Réunion, the Seychelles, Somalia, South Mozambique, Tanzania and in Polynesia and Australia.

References

 Verdcourt, B. (1954). The cowries of the East African Coast (Kenya, Tanganyika, Zanzibar and Pemba). Journal of the East Africa Natural History Society 22(4) 96: 129–144, 17 pls.

External links
  Felix Lorenz and Alex Hubert : A Guide to Worldwide Cowries, second revised edition, Conch Books, 2002 
 Nudipixel

Cypraeidae
Gastropods described in 1758
Taxa named by Carl Linnaeus